GTK (formerly GTK+) is a free and open-source cross-platform widget toolkit for creating graphical user interfaces (GUIs). It is licensed under the terms of the GNU Lesser General Public License, allowing both free and proprietary software to use it. It is one of the most popular toolkits for the Wayland and X11 windowing systems.

The GTK team releases new versions on a regular basis. GTK 4 and GTK 3 are maintained, while GTK 2 is end-of-life. GTK1 is independently maintained by the CinePaint project.

Software architecture

The GTK library contains a set of graphical control elements (widgets); version 3.22.16 contains 186 active and 36 deprecated widgets. GTK is an object-oriented widget toolkit written in the programming language C; it uses GObject, that is the GLib object system, for the object orientation. While GTK is mainly for windowing systems based on X11 and Wayland, it works on other platforms, including Microsoft Windows (interfaced with the Windows API), and macOS (interfaced with Quartz). There is also an HTML5 back-end named Broadway.

GTK can be configured to change the look of the widgets drawn; this is done using different display engines. Several display engines exist which try to emulate the look of the native widgets on the platform in use.

Starting with version 2.8, released in 2005, GTK began the transition to using Cairo to render most of its graphical control elements widgets. Since GTK version 3.0, all rendering is done using Cairo.

On 26 January 2018 at DevConf.cz, Matthias Clasen gave an overview of the current state of GTK 4 development, including a high-level explanation of how rendering and input worked in GTK 3, what changes are being made in GTK 4 (>3.90), and why. On 6 February 2019 it was announced that GTK 4 will drop the “+” from the project's name.

GTK Drawing Kit (GDK)

GDK acts as a wrapper around the low-level functions provided by the underlying windowing and graphics systems.

GDK is found in the /gdk directory.

GTK Scene Graph Kit (GSK)

GSK is the rendering and scene graph API for GTK. GSK lies between the graphical control elements (widgets) and the rendering. GSK was finally merged into GTK version 3.90 released March 2017.

GSK is found in the /gsk directory.

GtkInspector
GtkInspector was introduced with version 3.14.
GtkInspector can only be invoked after installing the development package libgtk-3-dev/gtk+-devel.

GUI designers
There are several GUI designers for GTK. The following projects are active as of July 2011:
 Glade, supports GtkBuilder, which is a GTK built-in GUI description format.
 Gazpacho, GUI builder for the GTK toolkit written in Python
 Crow Designer, relies on its own GuiXml format and GuiLoader library.
 Stetic, part of MonoDevelop, oriented toward Gtk#.
 Gambas since version 2.0 atop BASIC
 Xojo on Linux
 Lazarus on Linux defaults to interfacing with GTK 2

GtkBuilder
GtkBuilder allows user interfaces to be designed without writing code. The interface is described in an Extensible Markup Language (XML) file, which is then loaded at runtime and the objects created automatically. The Glade Interface Designer allows creation of the user interface in a what you see is what you get (WYSIWYG) manner. The description of the user interface is independent from the programming language being used.

Language bindings

Language bindings are available for using GTK from languages other than C, including C++, Genie, JavaScript, Perl, Python, Vala, and others.

GtkSharp, not to be confused with Gtk#, supports GTK 3.

Gtk#

Gtk# is a set of .NET Framework bindings for the GTK graphical user interface (GUI) toolkit and assorted GNOME libraries. The library facilitates building graphical GNOME applications using Mono or any other compliant Common Language Runtime (CLR). Gtk# is an event-driven system like any other modern windowing library where every widget allows associating handler methods, which get called when certain events occur.

Applications built using Gtk# will run on many platforms including Linux, Windows and macOS. The Mono packages for Windows include GTK, Gtk# and a native theme to make applications look like native Windows applications. Starting with Mono 1.9, running Gtk# applications on macOS no longer requires running an X11 server.

Glade Interface Designer can be used with the Glade# bindings to easily design GUI applications. A GUI designer named Stetic is integrated with the MonoDevelop integrated development environment (IDE).

In addition to support the standard GTK/GNOME stack of development tools, the  assembly provides a bridge to consume functionality available on the .NET stack. At this point this includes the functionality to use System.Drawing to draw on a widget.

, Gtk# support for Gtk3 remains in the preview phase and forked projects, such as GtkSharp, have been founded to provide full Gtk3 support for C# and other CLI languages. The lack of a released version of Gtk# with support for Gtk3 was cited as a reason to remove the Banshee media player in Ubuntu 12.04.

Development
GTK is mainly developed by The GNOME Project, which also develops the GNOME Development Platform and the GNOME Desktop Environment.

GTK development is loosely managed. Discussion chiefly occurs on several public mailing lists. GNOME developers and users gather at an annual GNOME Users And Developers European Conference GUADEC meeting to discuss GNOME's current state and future direction. GNOME incorporates standards and programs from freedesktop.org to better interoperate with other desktops.

GTK is mainly written in C. Many language bindings are available.

On 1 September 2016 a post on the GTK development blog denoted, among other things, the future numbering scheme of GTK. GTK version 3.22, released in Autumn 2016, was planned to be the last 3.x release, although version 3.24 followed in Fall 2018 with the delay of GTK 4.
The development of GTK 4 used version names 3.90, 3.92, etc. until the first GTK 4.0 stable release was launched in December 2020. Despite the first stable GTK 4 release, some applications using GTK still rely on GTK 2. For example, as of January 2022, GIMP is still being ported to GTK 3.

Build automation
GTK (and GNOME, GLib, etc.) formerly utilized the GNU Build System (named Autotools) as the build automation system of choice.

Since 14 Aug 2017, the master branch of GTK has been built with Meson, and the Autotools build system files have been dropped.

Criticism
The most common criticism of GTK is the lack of backward-compatibility in major updates, most notably in the application programming interface (API) and theming.

The compatibility breaks between minor releases during the GTK 3.x development cycle was explained by Benjamin Otte as due to strong pressures to innovate, such as providing the features modern users expect and supporting the increasingly influential Wayland display server protocol. With the release of GTK 4, the pressure from the need to innovate will have been released and the balance between stability and innovation will tip toward stability. Similarly, recent changes to theming are specifically intended to improve and stabilise that part of the API, meaning some investment now should be rewarded later.

 Dirk Hohndel, codeveloper of Subsurface and member of Intel's Open-Source Technology Center, criticized the GTK developers for being abrasive and ignoring most community requests.
 Hong Jen Yee, developer of LXDE (the GTK version of which was dropped and all efforts focused on the Qt port), expressed disdain for version 3 of the GTK toolkit's radical API changes and increased memory usage, and ported PCMan File Manager (PCManFM) to Qt. PCManFM is being developed with a GTK and with a Qt backend at the same time.
 The Audacious music player moved to Qt in version 3.6. The reasons stated by the developers for this include a transition to client-side window decorations, which they claim cause the application to look "GNOME-y and out of place."
 Wireshark has switched to Qt due to not having a good experience with GTK's cross-platform support.

Use

Applications

Some notable applications that use GTK as a widget toolkit include:

 Ardour, a digital audio workstation (DAW)
 Deluge, a Bit Torrent client
 Foliate, an ebook reader
 GIMP, a raster graphics editor
 GNOME Builder, an integrated development environment (IDE)
 GNOME Core Applications, a collection of applications as a standard bundle of the GNOME desktop environment
 GNOME Evolution, a personal information manager
 HandBrake, digital video transcoder
 Inkscape, a vector graphics editor
 LibreOffice, an office suite
 Lutris, a game manager
 Mozilla Firefox, a web browser
 Mozilla Thunderbird, a personal information manager
 Pitivi, a video editor
 PCSX-Reloaded, a video game console emulator
 Remmina, a remote desktop client
 Transmission, a Bit Torrent client

Desktop environments

Several desktop environments utilize GTK as the widget toolkit.

Current
 GNOME, based on GTK, meaning that programs native to GNOME use GTK
 Budgie, built from scratch for the SolusOS successor, Solus Operating System
 Cinnamon, a fork of GNOME 3 which uses GTK version 3
 MATE, a fork of GNOME 2 which uses GTK 3 since version 1.18
 Xfce, based on GTK 3 since version 4.14
 Pantheon uses GTK 3 exclusively, being developed by elementary OS
 Sugar, a desktop environment for youth primary education, which uses GTK, especially PyGTK
 Phosh, a mobile UI designed for PureOS
 LXDE (Lightweight X11 Desktop Environment) is based on GTK 2
 Unity, the former default desktop environment of Ubuntu

Inactive
 Access Linux Platform (successor of the Palm OS PDA platform)
 Consort, the GNOME 3.4 Fallback Mode – fork from SolusOS
 GPE, the GPE Palmtop Environment
 ROX Desktop, a lightweight desktop, with features from the GUI of RISC OS

Miscellaneous
GTK programs can be run on desktop environments based on X11 and Wayland, or window managers even those not made with GTK, provided the needed libraries are installed; this includes macOS if X11.app is installed. GTK can be also run on Microsoft Windows, where it is used by some popular cross-platform applications like Pidgin and GIMP. wxWidgets, a cross-platform GUI tool-kit, uses GTK on Linux by default. Other ports include DirectFB (used by the Debian installer, for example) and ncurses.

Window managers
The following window managers use GTK:

 Aewm
 AfterStep
 Amaterus
 Consortium
 IceWM
 Marco
 Metacity
 Muffin
 Mutter
 Sawfish
 Wmg
 Xfwm

GtkSourceView

For syntax highlighting there is GtkSourceView, "source code editing widget". GtkSourceView is maintained by GNOME separately from GTK as a library: gtksourceview. There are plans to rename to gsv.

GtkSpell
GtkSpell is a library separate from GTK. GtkSpell depends on GTK and Enchant. Enchant is a wrapper for ispell, hunspell, etc., the actual spell checker engine/software. GtkSpell uses GTK's GtkTextView widget, to highlight misspelled words and offer replacement.

Example
Documentation is available here:
 

The following code presents a graphical GTK hello-world program in the C programming language. This program has a window with the title "Hello, world!" and a label with similar text.
// helloworld.c
#include <gtk/gtk.h>

/* Callback that will be called when the application is activated */
static void
activate_callback(GApplication *app, gpointer user_data)
{
    GtkWidget *window;
    GtkWidget *label;

    /* Create the main, top level window */
    window = gtk_window_new();

    /* Give it the title */
    gtk_window_set_title(GTK_WINDOW(window), "Hello, world!");

    /* Set the window's default size */
    gtk_window_set_default_size(GTK_WINDOW(window), 200, 100);

    /* Assign the variable "label" to a new GTK label,
     * with the text "Hello, world!" */
    label = gtk_label_new("Hello, world!");

    /* Plot the label onto the main window */
    gtk_window_set_child(GTK_WINDOW(window), label);

    /* Make the application aware of the window.
     * The application process will continue to run until all
     * windows are closed */
    gtk_application_add_window(GTK_APPLICATION(app), GTK_WINDOW(window));

    /* Make sure that everything, window and label, are visible */
    gtk_widget_show(window);
}

int main (int argc, char *argv[])
{
    /* Create our test application */
    GtkApplication *application = gtk_application_new("org.wikipedia.gtktest", 0);

    /* Connect our handler to the "activate" callback, which will be called
     * when the application is activated by the user, e.g. on first start */
    g_signal_connect(application, "activate", G_CALLBACK(activate_callback), NULL);

    /* Run the application and return its status */
    return g_application_run(G_APPLICATION(application), argc, argv);
}

Needs installing the libraries first in Debian or derivatives:
$ sudo apt-get install libgtk-4-dev

Using pkg-config in a Unix shell, this code can be compiled with the following command:
$ cc -Wall $(pkg-config --cflags --libs gtk4) helloworld.c -o helloworld

Invoke the program:
$ ./helloworld

History

Linux
GTK was originally designed and used in the GNU Image Manipulation Program (GIMP) as a replacement of the Motif toolkit; at some point Peter Mattis became disenchanted with Motif and began to write his own GUI toolkit named the GIMP toolkit and had successfully replaced Motif by the 0.60 release of GIMP. Finally GTK was re-written to be object-oriented and was renamed GTK+. This was first used in the 0.99 release of GIMP. GTK was subsequently adopted for maintenance by the GNOME Foundation, which uses it in the GNOME desktop environment.

The GTK 2.0.0 release series introduced new features which include improved text rendering using Pango, a new theme engine, improved accessibility using the Accessibility Toolkit, transition to Unicode using UTF-8 strings, and a more flexible API. Starting with version 2.8, GTK 2 depends on the Cairo graphics library for rendering vector graphics.

GTK version 3.0.0 included revised input device handling, support for themes written with CSS-like syntax, and the ability to receive information about other opened GTK applications.

The '+' was dropped returning to simply 'GTK' in February 2019 during a Hackathon.

macOS
With Quartz-backend GTK is available in macOS.

Windows
 After GTK 2.24.10 and 3.6.4 Development of Windows with Installer was closed by Gnome. Installation of MSYS2 on Windows is a good way to use actual GTK.
 GTK 2.24.10 and 3.6.4 is available in Internet, but very buggy and limited against actual versions.
 A version for Windows 64-bit is prepared by Tom Schoonjans with 2.24.33 (actual like Linux) and 3.24.24 (actual like Linux) from January 2021 available.
 Windows 10's Fall Creators Update includes Windows Subsystem for Linux (WSL). With Linux distributions like Ubuntu or Debian available from the Microsoft Store and an X server like Xming or VcXsvr, thousands of programs like GTK 2 or 3 can run with X or terminal support.

OpenVMS
HP stated that their goal was to merge the needed OpenVMS changes into the GTK Version 1.3 development stream, however this never materialised. The latest version of GTK for OpenVMS is version 1.2.10.

GTK 4
One of the cardinal novelties implemented during the GTK 4 development cycle (i.e. GTK 3.92, etc.) has been the removal of customization option for the user side (like individual keyboard shortcuts that could be set in GTK+ 2), the delegation of functionality to ancillary objects instead of encoding it into the base classes provided by GTK.
 the event handling from signal handlers described by GtkWidget is delegated to event controllers
 the rendering is delegated to GtkSnapshot objects
 the layout mechanism from GtkWidget is delegated to GtkLayoutManager

In 2018-Jan-26 at DevConf.cz Matthias Clasen gave an overview of the then current state of GTK 4 development, including a high-level explanation of how rendering and input worked in GTK 3, what changes were being made to GTK 4, and the reasons for those changes. Examples of things that have become possible with GTK 4 were given as well.

Releases

See also

 Client-Side Decoration
 List of widget toolkits
 GDK – the GIMP Drawing Kit lies between the xlib and the GTK library, handling basic rendering such as drawing primitives, raster graphics (bitmaps), cursors, fonts, as well as window events and drag-and-drop functionality
 gtkmm – C++ bindings for GTK
 Qt – cross platform framework and toolkit
 Xojo – cross-platform development tool and framework
 Enlightenment Foundation Libraries (EFL) – widget toolkit written for the Enlightenment window manager
 FLTK – a light, cross-platform, non-native widget toolkit
 FOX toolkit – a fast, open source, cross-platform widget toolkit
 IUP – a multi-platform toolkit for building native graphical user interfaces
 Ultimate++
 Visual Component Library (VCL)
 Vala – an object-oriented programming language with a self-hosting compiler that generates C code and uses the GObject system.
 wxWidgets - a cross-platform GUI toolkit whose goal is to directly use each platform's native graphic API whenever possible.

References

Bibliography

External links

 

 
Application programming interfaces
Articles with example C code
C (programming language) libraries
Cross-platform software
Free computer libraries
Free software programmed in C
GNOME
Software that uses Cairo (graphics)
Software that uses Meson
Software using the LGPL license
Widget toolkits
X-based libraries